Centranthus calcitrapae is a species of annual herb in the family Caprifoliaceae. Individuals can grow to 18 cm tall.

Sources

References 

calcitrapae
Flora of Malta